Colonel Leland Thornton "Lee" Kennedy (January 1, 1934 – December 28, 2003) was a career officer and pilot in the United States Air Force, and a highly decorated veteran of the Vietnam War. Kennedy flew the EC-121 Warning Star during the Cuban Missile Crisis, and later served two tours of duty in Vietnam.

In his second Vietnam tour, he distinguished himself as a combat search and rescue helicopter pilot, twice awarded the Air Force Cross in 1966 for actions occurring 15 days apart in which his crew, while under intense fire, rescued seven airmen who had been shot down in enemy territory. Kennedy is one of only four airmen to receive multiple awards of the Air Force Cross.

Kennedy also received the Silver Star, the Distinguished Flying Cross, the Air Medal with five oak leaf clusters, and numerous other medals and campaign ribbons during his career. 

After 30 years of service, Kennedy retired at Langley AFB, Hampton, Virginia, in 1985.

Education and family
From Kennedy's obituary:

Air Force career

Kennedy was commissioned through the Air Force Reserve Officer Training Corps program at the University of Kentucky on 30 May 1955, and went on active duty beginning 31 August 1955. After completing Undergraduate Pilot Training at Vance Air Force Base, Oklahoma, Kennedy entered helicopter training and completed it in March 1957. His first assignment was at Oxnard Air Force Base, California, from March 1957 to March 1959, flying Sikorsky SH-19B search and rescue helicopters, after which he completed Weapons Controller training and was assigned to the 4640th Support Squadron at Norton Air Force Base, California, from December 1960 to August 1962.

He was next assigned to the 963rd Airborne Early Warning and Control Squadron, 552nd AEWC Wing at McClellan Air Force Base, California, as a pilot flying EC-121 Warning Stars. During the Cuban Missile Crisis, he was assigned to its 966th AEWC Squadron based at McCoy Air Force Base, Florida, flying specially-modified EC-121Qs on Gold Digger missions (tracking Lockheed U-2 surveillance flights) and monitoring Cuban airspace.

In April 1965, still part of the airborne early warning force, Kennedy, now a captain and aircraft commander, was one of several crews of the 552nd AEWCW to be sent to Tan Son Nhut Air Base near Saigon, South Vietnam, as part of the Big Eye Task Force.

Upon completion of his temporary duty in Vietnam, Kennedy completed upgrade training to the HH-3E rescue helicopter at Sheppard Air Force Base, Texas, and became a pilot with the Aerospace Rescue and Recovery Service (ARRS).

Second Southeast Asia tour

Kennedy was stationed at Udorn Royal Thai Air Force Base, Thailand, with Detachment 5 of the 38th Aerospace Rescue and Recovery Squadron, a Combat Search and Rescue (CSAR) unit of six HH-3E "Jolly Green" helicopters. Standard operating procedures dispatched an airborne controller aircraft (a Lockheed HC-130H Hercules using the call sign Crown), two helicopters, and two to four A-1H Sandys tasked as rescue escort (initially "RESCORT" but later "RESCAP") on recovery missions. The force was divided into two tactical elements, with the initial recovery helicopter designated as Jolly Low and the backup as Jolly High. The ResCAP flight was likewise divided as Sandy Low and Sandy High, with Sandy Low Lead designated as the on-scene commander.

5 October 1966
On his eighth mission, and operating from a forward location at Nakhon Phanom RTAFB (NKP), Kennedy was aircraft commander ("RCC") of Jolly Green 04 on a CSAR for the crew of Tempest 03, an F-4C Phantom of the 433rd Tactical Fighter Squadron. His crew consisted of copilot ("RCCP") 1st Lt. Donald R. Harris, flight engineer ("HM") SSgt. Donald Joe Hall, and pararescueman ("PJ") A2C Robert B. Williamson.

The rescue location was 300 miles distant inside North Vietnam, in a box canyon 20 miles northeast of Nà Sản. The F-4 had been an escort fighter for a pair of EB-66 electronic countermeasures (ECM) aircraft, and had been shot down by a MiG-21. Kennedy had not yet performed a combat rescue and so received assignment as Jolly High, while Jolly Green 36, piloted by Capt. Oliver Edward O'Mara, Jr, was tasked to make the recovery.

In the rescue area two A-1 Sandys, after several strafing runs to drive off approaching troops, drew no fire on a final low pass over the area. O'Mara crested a ridgeline into the canyon and lowered his hoist to pick up the F-4's aircraft commander, Tempest 03A, with whom he was in radio communication. His helicopter was immediately hit from above by small arms fire, forcing O'Mara to pull out. Tempest 03A on his last transmission radioed that he had been hit in the chest. O'Mara made two further rescue attempts in the badly damaged HH-3E before his hoist was knocked out, forcing him to return to base. O'Mara was awarded the Air Force Cross in 1969 for his efforts.

Common procedure was that the secondary helicopter escorted a heavily damaged primary helicopter back to base, but Kennedy was asked to return to continue the pickup attempts of the F-4 backseater, Tempest 03B, Kennedy's first actual attempt at combat rescue. On the first try, his aircraft was hit and both enlisted men slightly wounded. The HH-3E was driven off by fire four times, taking more battle damage on each pass. Despite deteriorating weather conditions, a rupture in their forward fuel tank, and smoke in the aircraft, Kennedy's three crewmen joined him in wanting to try again. In the poor weather, Williamson noted that better reference points were on the left side of the aircraft and urged that Lt. Harris conduct the hover.

On the fifth attempt, hearing gunfire but not struck, the crew dropped the hoist and reeled in Tempest 03B, 1st Lt. Edward W. Garland, whose parachute filled with rotor wash and nearly entangled the rotors. Kennedy exfiltrated the area at low level, with the ridgetops above them concealed by lowering clouds. Below minimum fuel levels needed to return to Udorn, he flew Jolly Green 04 to Lima Site 36, a forward operating location at Na Khang, Laos. Kennedy was recommended for the Air Force Cross and his crew members each received the Silver Star for the rescue .

20 October 1966

Fifteen days later, on the morning of 20 October, Kennedy launched as Jolly Green 36 (high) on a CSAR with Jolly Green 02 (low), flown by Major Adrian D. Youngblood, to recover another 433rd TFS F-4C crew, that of Avenger 03, shot down in Laos southwest of Đồng Hới, North Vietnam.  His crew this mission consisted of RCCP 1st Lt. Elmer C. Lavender, HM SSgt. Raymond Godsey, and PJ A1C Robert J. Ward.

Both F-4 crewmen had landed in trees. Their wingmen had remained in the area, making repeated low level passes without a gun or ordnance to try to slow down the hostile forces trying to kill or capture the airmen. Jolly Green 02 lowered its hoist to the Phantom's rear seat pilot, 1st Lt. Joseph C. Merrick, who was suspended 150 feet in the air and had lashed himself to a tree. During the eight minutes of hover needed for Merrick to transfer from his parachute harness to the jungle penetrator and be brought up, Jolly Green 02 was hit numerous times from directly ahead and Merrick was twice wounded. Youngblood rotated its tail towards the gunfire to keep the pilots from being hit. As soon as Youngblood applied power to climb, the helicopter's transmission oil pressure failed, warning of imminent seizure of both engines. Youngblood broadcast a "Mayday" and searched for a field to make an emergency landing, flying six miles before spotting one.

Orbiting overhead, Kennedy had been unable to see the action because of thickening clouds. He descended, and after observing a village next to the clearing Youngblood had spotted, directed Jolly Green 02 to a field a half mile away. Aboard Jolly Green 36, Lt. Lavender jettisoned its external fuel tanks and dumped fuel to compensate for the added weight of Youngblood's crew and the F-4 pilot. On the ground about 25 yards from the other helicopter, Kennedy continued dumping fuel with his engines running and rotor turning, despite the risk of explosive vapors.

The crew of Jolly Green 02 and the wounded F-4 pilot ran to board Kennedy's aircraft under fire, during which both enlisted crewmen of JG 02 were also wounded. Carrying nine men, Kennedy performed a "maximum performance" liftoff. The A-1s covering the rescue then strafed the abandoned helicopter, during which Sandy 08 was shot down on its second pass and its pilot, Capt. David Raymond Wagener, killed. As Kennedy's HH-3E reached an altitude of 2,000 feet, he requested the location of the second crewman, which the Sandys provided. A forward air controller (FAC) in an O-1E Bird Dog spotted the F-4's aircraft commander, Major Lacy W. Breckenridge, still in a tree and used his wingtip to point to the location. Kennedy made a high speed descent to hover, but Communist soldiers emerged from the trees, firing at the helicopter with small arms. Airman Ward returned fire with an M-16. The rescue was effected although under attack the entire time. On the return flight Sandy 05, another escort, reported that it was losing power, and Kennedy escorted it to NKP, where both landed safely.

16 February 1967
Kennedy's unit was redesignated as Detachment 1, 37th ARRS on 16 January 1967 and relocated to NKP. On 6 February Jolly Green 05 (low) from NKP, on a CSAR to rescue a downed Forward Air Controller, was shot down with three of its four crew members killed in action, including Donald Joe Hall, the flight engineer on Kennedy's first Air Force Cross mission.

On 16 February 1967, Dusty 71, an F-100D flown by Col. Frank Buzze, the Deputy Commander of Operations of the 31st Tactical Fighter Wing, was shot down while conducting an interdiction mission along the Ho Chi Minh Trail in Saravane Province of southern Laos. Buzze ejected and landed on the hillside in rugged karst. Covered by his wingman and the FAC that had been working their mission, Covey 54, Buzze hid from searching Pathet Lao troops as a CSAR was launched by a pair of HH-3Es, Jolly Green 56 (low) and Jolly Green 07 (high), forward-located and on ground alert at Quảng Trị in Vietnam. From NKP, a second mission also launched, Kennedy in Jolly Green 36 (low) and Capt. Robert L. Powell in Jolly Green 37 (high). Kennedy's crew consisted of RCCP 1st Lt. James A. Colyer, Godsey as HM, and PJ A2C Robert D. Bowers.

Jolly Green 56 located Buzze and attempted to hover for pickup but was struck repeatedly from three sides by automatic weapons fire, killing the RCC, Capt. Angelo Pullara, and wounding the RCCP Capt. Jerrold D. Ward. Led by Jolly Green 07 and assisted on the controls by the flight engineer, Ward flew the stricken helicopter to an emergency landing at nearby Saravane. After the aborted pickup, Buzze moved approximately a kilometer out of the area while A-1s continued efforts to suppress the AAA fire.  Jollys 36 and 37 arrived on scene and the on-scene commander again authenticated Buzze's identity and new location. Kennedy then attempted a pickup, but like Jolly Green 56, was struck repeatedly in the hover, damaging a fuel cell and the aft portion of the aircraft, forcing him to return to base. After further suppression runs by the Sandys, Jolly Green 37 made a third attempt and successfully picked up Buzze more than four hours after his shoot-down. For his role in the mission, Kennedy was awarded the Silver Star.

Subsequent career
"Kennedy flew 99 missions in Southeast Asia, totalling 354 hours of combat flight time ... Kennedy was referred to by Secretary of the Air Force Harold Brown as a major figure in 'one of the most outstanding human dramas in the history of the Air Force.'"

At the conclusion of his SEA tour, Kennedy was assigned as a CH-3E pilot with the 1042nd Test Squadron at Dover Air Force Base, Delaware, from August 1967 to July 1970; and with the 5040th Helicopter Squadron at Elmendorf Air Force Base, Alaska, from July 1970 to July 1972. From July 1972 to June 1975 he was on staff at the Headquarters, Alaskan Command. Kennedy served as Assistant Director Region Control Center with the 21st Air Division at Hancock Field, New York, from August 1975 to September 1976, followed by duty as Assistant Deputy Commander for Operations of the 602nd Tactical Air Control Wing at Bergstrom Air Force Base, Texas, from October 1976 to October 1978. He returned to Elmendorf AFB and served with Headquarters, Alaskan Air Command and as commander of the 531st Aircraft Control and Warning Group (re-designated 11th Tactical Control Group in 1981) from October 1978 to December 1982. His final assignments were as Deputy Director and then Director, Operational Plans and Support in the office of the Deputy Chief of Staff Operations, Headquarters Tactical Air Command at Langley Air Force Base, Virginia, from December 1982 until his retirement from the Air Force on 1 October 1985.

Awards and decorations

Citations

AFC first award
Captain Leland T. Kennedy
Department of the Air Force, Special Order GB-68 (February 16, 1967)
Citation:

AFC second award
Captain Leland T. Kennedy
Department of the Air Force, Special Order GB-156 (May 9, 1967)
Citation:

Silver Star Award
Captain Leland T. Kennedy
Seventh Air Force, Special Order G-140 (May 15, 1967)
Citation:

Notes
Footnotes

Citations

References
Davis, Larry (1999). "USAF Search & Rescue Part 2", Wings of Fame Volume 14, Aerospace Publishing Ltd, London. 
LaPointe, Robert L. (2000). PJs in Vietnam: The Story of Air Rescue in Vietnam as Seen Through the Eyes of Pararescuemen, Northern PJ Press.

External links
 Valor Awards for Leland Thornton Kennedy, Military Times Hall of Valor
 "Leland T. Kennedy" @ Veteran Tributes
 966th AEW&CS "Gold Digger Missions" by George Merryman
 The Search for Jolly Green 36
 Virtual Wall: William Richard Andrews

1934 births
2003 deaths
United States Air Force personnel of the Vietnam War
Recipients of the Air Force Cross (United States)
Recipients of the Distinguished Flying Cross (United States)
Recipients of the Air Medal
Recipients of the Legion of Merit
Recipients of the Silver Star
Burials at Arlington National Cemetery
Military personnel from Louisville, Kentucky
People from Yorktown, Virginia
United States Air Force colonels
Recipients of the Meritorious Service Medal (United States)